Bhingar, also known as Bhingar Camp, is a census town in Ahmednagar district  in the state of Maharashtra, India.

History
Aurangzeb, the last prominent Mughal emperor, died at Bhingar in 1707. The place is known as Alamgir and a small monument marks the site. His tomb is situated at Khuldabad near Aurangabad.

There is a very famous and very old temple of Lord Shiva called Shukleshwar Temple in Bhingar.

There is a legend that Bhrugu rushi did tapasya here on a hillock where a temple is erected in his honour. The name Bhingar is derived from the sage. This temple is situated at the centre of the city.

Demographics
 India census, Bhingar had a population of 7620. Males constituted 51% of the population and females 49%. Bhingar had an average literacy rate of 73% at that time, higher than the national average of 59.5%; with a male literacy of 79% and a female literacy of 66%. About 13% of the population was under 6 years of age.

Notable residents
 Anna Hazare Right to Information Act (RTI) Activist. He spent the first six years of his life in Lohar Galli, Bhingar.

References

Cities and towns in Ahmednagar district